Kamalabad (also Romanized as Kamālābād) is a village in Estarabad-e Shomali Rural District, Baharan District, Gorgan County, Golestan Province, Iran. At the 2006 census, its population was 247, in 69 families.

References 

Populated places in Gorgan County